Jack Sheridan (born 1997) is an Irish hurler who plays for Kildare Senior Championship club Naas and at inter-county level with the Kildare senior hurling team. He usually lines out as a forward.

Career

Sheridan first came to hurling prominence at juvenile and underage levels with the Naas club. He eventually joined the club's senior team and was part of their 2019 County Championship-winning team. Sheridan first appeared at inter-county level with the Kildare minor team in 2015 before later lining out with the under-21 side. He was straight out of the minor grade when he was drafted onto the Kildare senior hurling team for the 2016 National Hurling League. Sheridan has since won two Christy Ring Cup titles.

Honours

Naas
Kildare Senior Hurling Championship: 2019, 2020,2021

Leinster Intermediate Club Championship 2021

All Ireland Intermediate Championship 2021 (Played in February 2022)

Kildare
Christy Ring Cup: 2018, 2020
Kehoe Cup: 2016

References

1997 births
Living people
Naas hurlers
Kildare inter-county hurlers
People from Naas